In 2009, Bernice Novack and her son, Fontainebleau Miami Beach hotel heir Ben Novack Jr., were murdered three months apart. Narcy Novack (née Narcisa Véliz Pacheco; born 1956), Ben's estranged wife, was convicted of orchestrating the murders and after a highly publicized trial, was sentenced to life in prison without the possibility of parole.

Crimes
On April 5, 2009, Ben's 87-year-old mother, Bernice (December 2, 1921 – April 4, 2009), was found dead in her Fort Lauderdale, Florida garage. Her husband Ben Novack Sr., who built the hotel and owned it until 1977, had died in 1985. Her death was initially ruled to be the result of an accidental fall while trying to get out of her car in her garage, but after her son's murder three months later, a subsequent police investigation revealed that her death was a homicide.

On the morning of July 12, 2009, her son, who was 53, was found bludgeoned and suffocated to death in the penthouse suite at the Hilton Hotel in Rye Brook, New York. He was bound with duct tape and his eyes were gouged out. At the time of his death, he was having an affair with porn actress Rebecca Bliss. He was also the heir to a multimillion-dollar estate.

Trial
Narcy Novack, from Fort Lauderdale, was arrested for the murders of her husband and mother-in-law in July 2010, three days shy of a year after her husband's death. Her brother, Cristóbal Véliz, was also accused of enlisting Alejandro Gutiérrez-García, Joel González, and Denis Ramírez to participate in both murders. 

Narcy Novack and Cristóbal Véliz were tried together in a federal courtroom in White Plains, New York in 2012. The duo's defense was to blame Narcy's only daughter from a previous marriage, May Abad, for having orchestrated the killings, stating that she was motivated to collect on Ben Novack Jr.'s estate, including a large collection of Batman memorabilia. Prosecutors alleged that Narcy was afraid that her husband would leave her for his mistress, and that a prenuptial agreement would only leave her $65,000 instead of the bulk of her late husband's estate. They claimed she was motivated by "hatred, greed, and vengeance."

Verdict
At the conclusion of the trial, Narcy and Veliz were each convicted of murder, conspiracy to commit murder, domestic violence, stalking, money laundering, and witness tampering. Narcy waived her right to appear in court when the guilty verdict was read. She also did not appear in court when she was sentenced to life in prison without parole. Novack is currently incarcerated at the Federal Correctional Institution Tallahassee in Tallahassee, Florida. Véliz was also sentenced to life in prison without parole and he is currently incarcerated at the United States Penitentiary, Big Sandy in Inez, Kentucky. Gutiérrez-García, González, and Ramírez all pleaded guilty to lesser charges.

In accordance with the slayer rule, Narcy Novack is ineligible to inherit her husband's estate. Ben Novack Jr.'s estate, valued at $4.2 million, is expected to go to Novack's daughter, May Abad, and Abad's two sons.

In the media
The Novack murders have been televised on several programs including Deadly Rich, My Dirty Little Secret (ID), 48 Hours, Dateline NBC, Snapped, True Crime with Aphrodite Jones and Dying to Belong.

The story was also the basis for the 2015 made-for-television Lifetime movie Beautiful & Twisted, which starred Rob Lowe as Ben Novack Jr., Paz Vega as Narcy, and Candice Bergen as Bernice Novack.

References

External links
FBI Press Release:  Sentencing of Narcisa Veliz Novack and Cristobal Veliz  (December 17, 2012)
U.S. Department of Justice Press Release: Alejandro Garcia Sentenced In White Plains Federal Court To 17 Years And Six Months In Prison For The Beating Deaths Of Ben And Bernice Novack (September 12, 2013)

2009 in Florida
2009 in New York (state)
2009 murders in the United States
2012 in New York (state)
April 2009 crimes in the United States
Deaths by beating in the United States
Deaths from asphyxiation
Domestic violence in the United States
History of Fort Lauderdale, Florida
July 2009 crimes in the United States
Mariticides
People murdered in Florida
People murdered in New York (state)
Rye, New York
Stalking